Nikolay Yordanov (sometimes shown as Nikolay Jordanov, born October 18, 1969) is a Bulgarian sprint canoer who competed from the late 1980s to the mid-1990s. He won a bronze medal in the K-4 500 m event at the 1989 ICF Canoe Sprint World Championships in Plovdiv.

Yordanov also competed in three Summer Olympics, earning his best finish of eighth twice in the K-4 1000 m event (1992, 1996).

References

Sports-reference.com profile

1969 births
Bulgarian male canoeists
Canoeists at the 1988 Summer Olympics
Canoeists at the 1992 Summer Olympics
Canoeists at the 1996 Summer Olympics
Living people
Olympic canoeists of Bulgaria
ICF Canoe Sprint World Championships medalists in kayak